Emily Ballou is an Australian-American poet, novelist and screenwriter. Her poetry collection The Darwin Poems, a verse portrait of Charles Darwin, was published by University of Western Australia Press in 2009. It was written as part of an Australia Council for the Arts residency at the Tyrone Guthrie Centre in County Monaghan, Ireland.

Background 
Emily Ballou was born in Milwaukee, Wisconsin. She studied Film and English at University of Wisconsin–Milwaukee, graduating with a Bachelor in Fine Arts with Honours and completed a Master of Letters in Gender and Cultural Studies at the University of Sydney. She subsequently immigrated to Australia. She now lives in Glasgow, Scotland.

Career
She wrote the "Anouk" and "Aisha" episodes of the Australian Broadcasting Corporation's television mini-series The Slap, the original adaptation of Christos Tsiolkas’ novel of the same name, which won the 2012 AWGIE Awards for Television Mini-Series (Adaptation). It was aired in the UK on BBC4 and nominated for a Royal Television Society Award, a BAFTA award and an International Emmy Award.

Ballou has also written episodes of BBC One/FX Taboo, Channel 4/AMC Humans, BBC One's Case Histories (series 2, "Nobody's Darling"), ITV's Scott & Bailey, National Geographic's TV movie American Blackout, co-written with Ewan Morrison, and Family, directed by Shaun Gladwell in the anthology film The Turning, adapted from Tim Winton's book of short stories and screened in the Berlinale Special Galas section of the 64th Berlin International Film Festival. Her television series One Night started filming in February 2023.

She is also the author of the novels Father Lands (Picador, 2002), Aphelion (Picador, 2007) and the picture book One Blue Sock (with illustrations by Stephen Michael King) (Random House, 2007).

Awards and nominations 
 1997 – The Ibis Foundation's Judith Wright Prize for Poetry for the poem "Enter"
 2003 – Sydney Morning Herald Best Young Novelist for Father Lands
 2009 – Wesley Michel Wright Poetry Prize for The Darwin Poems
2009 – Fellowship of Australian Writers Anne Elder Award: Highly Commended for The Darwin Poems
 2010 – Mary Gilmore Prize: Shortlisted for The Darwin Poems
 2010 – Australian Literature Society Gold Medal: Shortlisted for The Darwin Poems
 2010 – Western Australian Premier's Book Awards: Shortlisted for The Darwin Poems
 2010 – New South Wales Premier's Literary Awards: Shortlisted for The Darwin Poems

Bibliography 
2002 – Father Lands, Picador: Pan Macmillan Australia, .
2007 – One Blue Sock, Random House Australia, . 
2007 – Aphelion, Picador: Pan Macmillan Australia, .
2009 – The Darwin Poems, University of Western Australia Press, .

Anthologies 
2008 – "On the Splice", Best Australian Short Stories
2009 – "Here is a Hair from Her Head", Best Australian Short Stories
2010 – "Darwin as Metaphor", Journal 19: Interdisciplinary Studies in the Long Nineteenth Century, Birkbeck: University of London, No. 11, pp. 1–17.
2010 – "The Beach", The Penguin Book of the Ocean

References

External links 
 
 Emily Ballou interviewed for the Darwin Correspondence Project
 Emily Ballou "Darwin as Metaphor", Journal 19
 Emily Ballou interviewed by Sarah L'Estrange on ABC radio's The Book Show, Dec 9th, 2009
 Emily Ballou interviewed by Mark Metcalf, Aug 19th, 2010
 "Darwin's Noah" on YouTube
 Emily Ballou reads "The Kite", The Red Room Company
 Emily Ballou interviewed by Magdalena Ball for The Compulsive Reader
 Emily Ballou interviews Hanif Kureshi for The Australian Magazine, Nov 15th, 2008
 Emily Ballou "Twenty Questions for the Nation", New Matilda, May 1, 2008

Living people
University of Wisconsin–Milwaukee alumni
Year of birth missing (living people)
21st-century American novelists
21st-century American poets
American women novelists
American television producers
American television writers
Novelists from Wisconsin
21st-century American screenwriters
21st-century American women writers